Mohamadou Sumareh (born 20 September 1994) is a professional footballer who plays as a winger for Malaysia Super League club Johor Darul Ta'zim. Born in the Gambia, he represents the Malaysia national team.

Sumareh obtained Malaysian citizenship through naturalization in 2018 and has represented their national team since. He has been nicknamed "Keliboy" by Pahang fans.

Mohamadou Sumareh began his career at Terengganu in January 2012. Sumareh moved to Polis Di Raja Malaysia in December 2012. In December 2015 he joined Perlis, making 19 league appearances and scoring 5 goals. Sumareh's spell at Perlis didn't last long and in December 2016 he joined Pahang, making 98 league appearances and scoring 17 goals in 5 years. Sumareh joined current club Johor Darul Ta'zim in February 2021. In terms of personal accolades, Sumareh has a single Malaysian Midfielder of the Year award to his name.

Early years
Sumareh was born in Fajara, the Gambia. His family moved to the capital Banjul after his birth.

In 2006, Sumareh went to Malaysia at the age of 12, following his father who worked as a businessman and began living here three years later. From then on, he learned a lot about the country, especially in the local culture and also in football. He trained at the Kuala Lumpur Youth Soccer (KLYS) academy as a teenager. 
Sumareh was offered the chance to join the Steve Biko academy in Gambia in late-2010. However, he was not offered a professional contract.

In late 2011, Sumareh attend a trial with Terengganu. He was registered for 2012 Malaysian League season by the Terengganu management but they decided to cancel his name from registration.

Club career

Royal Malaysia Police
In 2013, Sumareh signed for Malaysia Premier League club PDRM on a two-year contract. He made his first-team debut and his only season appearances on 7 January 2013 against Betaria in a 5–0 win at (Hang Jebat Stadium). He also scored in his debut match but it cut short with an injury that ruled him out for the rest of the season.

He return from injury and played a vital part of PDRM 2014 season. He succeeded in helping PDRM to become the 2014 Malaysia Premier League champions, thus promoted to the Super league for 2015 Malaysia Super League.

Perlis
Sumareh signed for Perlis on a one-year contract after the end of the contract with PDRM. He made his Perlis debut on 26 February 2016 against Sime Darby in the Malaysia Premier League, with a 1–1 away draw.

Pahang
After helping Perlis reach in the sixth place in Premier League, Sumareh joined Pahang on a free transfer in December 2016 after signing a two-year deal with the Super League club. He made his club debut on 21 January 2017 in Super League Match against Perak away, which resulted in a 1–1 draw. His first Super League goal came on his Darul Makmur Stadium debut on 27 January 2017, in the 14th minute with a 5–0 victory against T–Team.

Police Tero
On 7 September 2020, Sumareh signed for Thai League 1 club, Police Tero.

Johor Darul Ta'zim
On 9 February 2021, Sumareh joined Malaysia Super League club Johor Darul Ta'zim. On 7 October 2022, he made his 100 Malaysia Super League appearances against his former club Pahang.

International career
In October 2018, Sumareh was called up for the Malaysia national team central training from 8 October to prepare for two international friendly matches against Sri Lanka and Kyrgyzstan. He is the first player called to the Malaysia national team since the 1960s, who was neither born in Malaysia nor have any of his ancestors Malaysian-born or having Malaysian citizenship.

He made his debut on 12 October 2018, in a warm-up match against Sri Lanka. In that match, he came on as a substitute and scored his first international goal in a 4–1 victory. He later scored again in a 3–0 win against Maldives on 4 November 2018. A day later, he was selected to the last 23-man squad for the 2018 AFF Suzuki Cup. On 5 September 2019 he scored a crucial last-minute goal against Indonesia in the FIFA World Cup Qualifiers. Malaysia won the match 2–3 at Gelora Bung Karno Stadium, Jakarta. On 15 November 2019, he also scored the decisive goal that helped Malaysia win against Thailand 2–1 at Bukit Jalil, Kuala Lampur.

Personal life
Sumareh received his Malaysian citizenship in April 2018 after staying in the country for more 5 years. He is a former student of Maz International School in Shah Alam and SEGi College.

Career statistics

Club

International

As of match played 8 June 2022. Malaysia score listed first, score column indicates score after each Sumareh goal.

Honours 
PDRM
 Malaysia Premier League: 2014
 People's Cup: 2015

Johor Darul Ta'zim F.C.
 Malaysia Super League: 2021, 2022
 Malaysia FA Cup: 2022PAHANG F.C.
 Malaysia FA Cup: 2018

Malaysia
 AFF Championship runners up: 2018

Individual
2018 AFF Championship: Best Eleven
 Malaysia Football League Best Midfielder: 2019

References

External links

 

1994 births
Living people
Sportspeople from Banjul
Gambian footballers
Malaysian footballers
Association football wingers
Gambian emigrants to Malaysia
Naturalised citizens of Malaysia
Malaysian people of Gambian descent
Gambian expatriate footballers
PDRM FA players
Perlis FA players
Sri Pahang FC players
Mohamadou Sumareh
Johor Darul Ta'zim F.C. players
Malaysia Super League players
Mohamadou Sumareh
Malaysia international footballers
Malaysian expatriate footballers
Malaysian expatriate sportspeople in Thailand
Gambian expatriate sportspeople in Thailand
Expatriate footballers in Thailand